Huang Qifan (born May 1952) is a Chinese politician, best known for his term as the Mayor of Chongqing, one of China's four directly-controlled municipalities, between 2010 and 2016. Huang began his political career in Shanghai and was transferred to Chongqing in 2001 as its Deputy Mayor, before being promoted to Mayor in 2010.

Career
Huang was born in Zhuji, Zhejiang province. During the Cultural Revolution he worked in a coking factory. He joined the Chinese Communist Party in 1976. His political career began in Shanghai's Pudong New Area in 1993. Between 1994 and 1995 Huang served as the Director of the Policy Research Office of the Communist Party organization in Shanghai. Between 1995 and 2001 Huang served as the Deputy Secretary-General of the Shanghai Municipal Government. Between 1998 and 1999 Huang took on a one-year stint pursuing his Executive MBA at the China Europe International Business School (CEIBS) in Shanghai.

Huang was transferred to work in Chongqing in 2001, several years after the city was elevated to "Direct-controlled Municipality" status equivalent to that of Shanghai. He was the city's Deputy Mayor from 2001 to 2009 and sat on the Communist Party's Chongqing Standing Committee. Huang is unique in that he has served under four Chongqing Party Secretaries He Guoqiang, Wang Yang, Bo Xilai, and Zhang Dejiang, each with their unique set of policies and political beliefs, and all of whom went on to become prominent politicians at the national level. Huang is therefore considered a "political survivor", and has been dubbed the sichao yuanlao (roughly, "he who served four emperors.").

Huang was considered a key political ally of Bo Xilai, who abruptly fell out of favour with the national leadership following the Wang Lijun incident in February 2012. Many believe that Huang's political career had come to an end due to his association with Bo and the appointment of Zhang Dejiang as party secretary for Chongqing following Bo's dismissal in March 2012. During a televised government meeting, Huang expressed his support for Zhang. He was elected to the 18th Central Committee of the Chinese Communist Party in 2012, and re-elected Mayor of Chongqing in January 2013.

Huang left his post as mayor of Chongqing City on 29 December 2016; he then became Vice-Chair of the National People's Congress Financial and Economic Affairs Committee. He is also an adviser to the China Finance 40 Forum (CF40).

Huang has stated his opposition to the Hukou system, which he believes is unnecessarily reducing the competitiveness of older Chinese workers.

References

Mayors of Chongqing
Living people
1952 births
People's Republic of China politicians from Zhejiang
Politicians from Shaoxing
People from Zhuji